Category 3 the third-highest classification on the Australian tropical cyclone intensity scale is used to classify tropical cyclones, that have 10-minute sustained winds of .  79 tropical cyclones have peaked as Category 3 severe tropical cyclones in the South Pacific tropical cyclone basin, which is denoted as the part of the Pacific Ocean to the south of the equator and to the east of 160°E. The earliest tropical cyclone to be classified as a Category 3 severe tropical cyclone was Dolly which was classified as a Category 3 severe tropical cyclone . The latest was Ana as it moved south-eastwards away from the Fijian Islands. This list does include any tropical cyclones that went on to peak as a Category 4 or 5 severe tropical cyclone, while in the Southern Pacific tropical cyclone basin.

Background
The South Pacific tropical cyclone basin is located to the south of the Equator between 160°E and 120°W. The basin is officially monitored by the Fiji Meteorological Service and the New Zealand MetService, while other meteorological services such as the Australian Bureau of Meteorology, Météo-France as well as the United States Joint Typhoon Warning Center also monitor the basin. This scale is only officially used in American Samoa, however, various agencies including NASA also use it to compare tropical cyclones. A Category 3 tropical cyclone is expected to cause catastrophic devastation, if it significantly impacts land at or near its peak intensity.

Systems

|-
| Dolly ||  ||  ||  || ||  ||  ||
|-
| Emma ||  ||  ||  || ||  ||  ||
|-
| Ursula ||  ||  ||  || ||  ||  ||
|-
| Carlotta ||  ||  ||  || Solomon Islands, Vanuatu, New Caledonia || ||  ||
|-
| Wendy ||  ||  ||  || Vanuatu, New Caledonia || ||  ||
|-
| Yolande ||  ||  ||  || Vanuatu, New Caledonia || || ||
|-
| Agatha ||  ||  ||  || Cook Islands || ||  ||
|-
| Gail ||  ||  ||  || || || ||
|-
| Ida ||  ||  ||  || Solomon Islands, New Caledonia || ||  ||
|-
| Bebe ||  ||  ||  || Fiji, Tuvalu ||  ||  ||
|-
| Lottie –Natalie ||  ||  ||  || Fiji, Tonga ||  ||  ||
|-
| Alison ||  ||  ||  || Vanuatu, New Caledonia, New Zealand ||  ||  ||
|-
| Robert ||  ||  ||  || French Polynesia || ||  ||
|-
| Bob ||  ||  ||  || Vanuatu, New Caledonia, New Zealand ||  ||  ||
|-
| Charles ||  ||  ||  || Samoan Islands || ||  ||
|-
| Gordon ||  ||  ||  || Australia, Vanuatu, New Caledonia ||  ||  ||
|-
| Meli ||  ||  ||  || Fiji ||  ||  ||
|-
| Peni ||  ||  ||  || Fiji || || ||
|-
| Sina ||  ||  ||  || New Caledonia, New Zealand || || ||
|-
| Arthur ||  ||  ||  || || || ||
|-
| Cliff ||  ||  ||  || || || ||
|-
| Freda ||  ||  ||  || || || ||
|-
| Tahmar ||  ||  ||  || French Polynesia || ||  ||
|-
| Hettie ||  ||  ||  || || || ||
|-
| Mark ||  ||  ||  || Fiji || ||  ||
|-
| Nano ||  ||  ||  || French Polynesia || || ||
|-
| William ||  ||  ||  || French Polynesia || || 1 ||
|-
| Beti ||  ||  ||  || New Caledonia || || ||
|- 
| Eric ||  ||  ||  || Vanuatu, Fiji || || ||
|- 
| Nigel ||  ||  ||  || Vanuatu, Fiji || || ||
|-
| Freda ||  ||  ||  || || || ||
|-
| Martin ||  ||  ||  || || || ||
|-
| Namu ||  ||  ||  || Solomon Islands ||  ||  ||
|-
| Raja ||  ||  ||  || Wallis and Futuna, Fiji ||  ||  ||
|-
| Sally ||  ||  ||  || Cook Islands, French Polynesia ||  ||  ||
|-
| Tusi ||  ||  ||  || American Samoa ||  ||  ||
|-
| Wini ||  ||  ||  || Samoan Islands || Extensive || None ||
|-
| Yali ||  ||  ||  || Solomon Islands, Vanuatu, New Caledonia || || ||
|-
| Cilla ||  ||  ||  || || || ||
|-
| Hinano ||  ||  ||  || French Polynesia || || ||
|-
| Ivy ||  ||  ||  || New Caledonia, Vanuatu || || ||
|-
| Judy ||  ||  ||  || || || ||
|-
| Lili ||  ||  ||  || New Caledonia || || ||
|-
| Peni ||  ||  ||  || Cook Islands || || ||
|-
| Sina ||  ||   || || Fiji, Tonga ||  ||  ||
|-
| Tia ||  ||  ||  || Solomon Islands, Vanuatu || Unknown || None ||
|-
| Daman ||  ||  ||  || Tokelau, FijiVanuatu, New Zealand || || ||
|-
| Kina ||  ||  ||  || Fiji, Tonga ||  ||  ||
|-
| Lin ||  ||  ||  || || || ||
|-
| Polly ||  ||  ||  || Solomon Islands, New CaledoniaNew Zealand || || ||
|-
| Rewa ||  ||  ||  || || || ||
|-
| Tomas ||  ||  ||  || || || ||
|-
| Fergus ||  ||  ||  || || || ||
|-
| Evan ||  ||  ||  || || || ||
|-
| Hina ||  ||  ||  || Fiji, Tonga, TuvaluWallis and Futuna ||  ||  ||
|-
| Keli ||  ||  ||  || Tuvulu, Tonga, Wallis and Futuna ||  ||  ||
|-
| Martin ||  ||  ||  || Cook Islands, French Polynesia ||  ||  ||
|-
| Osea ||  ||  ||  || Cook Islands, French Polynesia || ||  ||
|-
| Katrina ||  ||  ||  || Solomon Islands, Vanuatu, Queensland || || ||
|-
| Yali ||  ||  ||  || || || ||
|-
| Zuman ||  ||  ||  || || || ||
|-
| Cora ||  ||  ||  || Tonga ||  ||  ||
|-
| Frank ||  ||  ||  || || || ||
|-
| Hali ||  ||  ||  || || ||  ||
|-
| Iris ||  ||  ||  || || ||  ||
|-
| Jo ||  ||  ||  || || ||  ||
|-
| Mona ||  ||  ||  || || ||  ||
|-
| Claudia ||  ||  ||  || || ||  ||
|-
| Ami ||  ||  ||  || Fiji, Tonga, Tuvalu ||  ||  ||
|-
| Gina ||  ||  ||  || Solomon Islands || || ||
|-
| Kerry ||  ||  ||  || || || ||
|-
| Jim ||  ||  ||  || || || ||
|-
| Vaianu ||  ||  ||  || || || ||
|-
| Wati ||  ||  ||  || || || ||
|-
| Yani ||  ||  ||  || || || ||
|-
| Gene ||  ||   || || Fiji ||  ||  ||
|-
| Pat ||  ||  ||  || Cook Islands ||  ||  ||
|-
| Rene ||  || ||  || Samoan islands, Tonga ||  || None ||
|-
| Yasi ||  ||  ||  || Tuvalu, Fiji, Solomon IslandsVanuatu, Queensland || Minor || 1 ||
|-
| Bune ||  ||  ||  || Fiji || None || None ||
|-
| Garry ||  ||  ||  || Tokelau, Wallis and FutunaSamoan Islands, Cook Islands || Minor || None ||
|-
| Lusi ||  ||  ||  || Fiji, New CaledoniaNew Zealand, Vanuatu ||  ||  ||
|-
| Ola ||  ||  ||  || New Caledonia || None || None ||
|-
| Victor ||  ||  ||  || Northern Cook Islands, Niue, Tonga || None || None ||
|-
| Zena ||  ||  ||  || Solomon Islands, VanuatuFiji, Tonga || Minimal || 2 ||
|-
| Amos ||  ||  ||  || Fiji, Wallis and Futuna, Samoan Islands || Minimal || None ||
|-
| Cook ||  ||  ||  || Vanuatu, New Caledonia, New Zealand || Moderate ||  ||
|-
| Keni ||  ||  ||  || Vanuatu, Fiji, Tonga ||  || None ||
|-
| Oma ||  ||  ||  || Solomon Islands, Vanuatu, New Caledonia ||  || 0 ||
|}

2020's

|-
| Tino ||  ||  ||  || Fiji, Niue, Solomon Islands, Samoa, Tonga, Tuvalu, Vanuatu ||  ||  || 
|-
| Uesi ||  ||  ||  || Solomon Islands, Vanuatu, New Caledonia, New Zealand ||  ||  || 
|-
| Ana ||  ||  ||  || Vanuatu, Fiji ||  ||  ||
|-
| Cody ||  ||  ||  || Fiji ||  ||  ||
|-
| Gabrielle ||  ||  ||  || Solomon Islands, Norfolk Island, New Zealand || || ||
|}

Other systems
In addition to the systems listed above, Severe Tropical Cyclone's Bebe, Gyan, Abigail, Nisha-Orama, Oscar, Tomasi, Veena, Uma, Bola, Wasa-Arthur, Joni, Sarah, Beti, Kim, Paula, Waka, Eseta, Ivy, Daman, Funa, Freda and Hola were all considered to have 1-minute sustained wind speeds equivalent to a Category 3 hurricane on the SSHWS by the JTWC.

Impacts

Notes

See also
List of Category 3 Atlantic hurricanes
List of Category 3 Pacific hurricanes

References

External links

South Pacific